Hari Bhakta Katuwal was an Indian-Nepali poet, writer and songwriter.

Biography 
Hari Bhakta Katuwal was born on 2 July 1935 in Dibrugarh, Assam. In India, he used to write poems under the name Prabasi. He moved to Kathmandu to pursue his writing career after being invited by King Mahendra.

Noted for his writing style, he published many poems including Bhitri Manche Bolna Khojch, Yo Zindagi Khai Ke Zindagi, and Samjhana. He was also addicted to drinking.

He also wrote lyrics that have been sung by Narayan Gopal, Amber Gurung, and Aruna Lama.

Katuwal died on 10 September 1980 in Assam. He was cremated at the banks of the Brahmaputra River in a Hindu ceremony.

In 2015, documentary Ani Hari Bhakta Farkiyenan about Katuwal's life was released. In 2017, a play was staged at the Sarwanam Theatre based on his poems for his 82nd birth anniversary. In 2021, a life-size statue of Katuwal was erected at Jaigaon near the Indo-Bhutan border.

Notable works 

 Samjhana (collection of songs) 
 Bhitri Manchhe Bolna Khojchha
 Sudha (short-epic) 
 Purba Kiran (collection of poems)
 Yo Jindagi Khai ke Jindagi (collection of poems) 
 Badanam Mera Yi Aankhaharoo (collection of songs and poems) 
 Aitihasik Kathasangraha (in collaboration with other writers) 
 Spastikaran
 Ma Mareko Chhaina (play)

See also 

 Lil Bahadur Chettri
 Peter J. Karthak
 Indra Bahadur Rai

References

Further reading 

 

1935 births
1980 deaths
20th-century Nepalese poets
20th-century Nepalese writers
Nepalese male poets
Nepalese male writers
Nepali-language writers
People from Dibrugarh district
Poets from Assam
Nepali-language writers from India
Khas people